Live in Las Vegas: A New Day... is the eighth home video by Canadian singer Celine Dion, released on DVD between 7–10 December 2007 in Europe, on 11 December 2007 in North America, on 15 December 2007 in Australia and on 19 December 2007 in Japan. It includes the record-breaking A New Day... show at Caesars Palace in Las Vegas, Nevada. The blu-ray edition was also released on 5 February 2008 in North America, and between 8–22 February 2008 in Europe. Live in Las Vegas: A New Day... topped  the charts in the United States, United Kingdom, Canada, France, Belgium, Switzerland, Denmark, Netherlands, Estonia and New Zealand, and reached top ten elsewhere. It was commercially successful achieving 3× Diamond status in Canada, Diamond in France and Multi-Platinum, Platinum and Gold in other countries. It also became the 19th best selling DVD of 2008 in Brazil.

Background
A New Day... ended on 15 December 2007, after a 5-year run of more than 700 shows and 3 million spectators. It reached one of the highest concert grosses in music history, $400,000,000.

The 2 disc home video contains more than 5 hours of never-before seen footage, including the concert and 3 exclusive documentaries: Because You Loved Me (A Tribute to the Fans), A New Day: All Access and A New Day: the Secrets. It contains subtitles in 9 languages. The inside booklet includes richly detailed photographs and generous liner notes.

History
The show was first filmed as a CBS special in celebration of the opening night performance entitled Celine in Las Vegas, Opening Night Live which aired on 25 March 2003. The special only featured 8 performances of songs from the original setlist plus a Behind the Scenes / Backstage featurette hosted by Justin Timberlake.

The originally scheduled DVD release date (autumn 2004) was postponed because of changes and improvements made to the show since the initial filming. The show was recorded in autumn 2003 (26, 27, 28, 29 and 30 November 2003) and included:

 "Nature Boy"
 "The Power of Love"
 "It's All Coming Back to Me Now"
 "Because You Loved Me"
 "To Love You More"
 "I'm Alive"
 "Seduces Me"
 "If I Could"
 "Have You Ever Been In Love"
 "At Last"
 "Fever"
 "I've Got the World on a String"
 "A New Love"
 "I Surrender"
 "The First Time Ever I Saw Your Face"
 "Aria Di Lucia De Lammermoor"
 "Ammore Annascunnuto"
 "Et je t'aime encore"
 "Love Can Move Mountains"
 "I Wish"
 "I Drove All Night"
 "My Heart Will Go On"
 "What a Wonderful World"

A New Day... was re-shot in high-definition during the 17–21 January 2007 week. According to the A New Day: the Secrets documentary on the second disc, one of the major reasons for the delay was that Dion and her producers gradually realized that Dion's change to a short blonde bob for A New Day... was highly unpopular with her fan base, and the hairstyle also looked terrible on screen during the first DVD shoot. As a result, she returned to her long brunette hair with extensions and the DVD was reshot.

The Live in Las Vegas - A New Day... video includes the last version of the show, performed between November 2006 and December 2007. But during previous years in the show, Dion wore alternate costumes and performed several other songs: "Nature Boy", "At Last", "Fever", "The First Time Ever I Saw Your Face", "Et je t'aime encore", "Have You Ever Been in Love", "Happy Xmas (War Is Over)", "God Bless America", "In Some Small Way",  "What a Wonderful World", "Can't Help Falling In Love", "Taking Chances" and "The Christmas Song".

"Nature Boy," "At Last," "Fever," "Et je t'aime encore," and "What a Wonderful World" were included on the A New Day... Live in Las Vegas CD, released in June 2004.

"The First Time Ever I Saw Your Face" was filmed during Celine in Las Vegas, Opening Night Live although it does not appear on any official release.

Other songs that have not been included neither on cd nor on DVD include:   "Have You Ever Been in Love", "God Bless America", "Happy Xmas (War Is Over)", "In Some Small Way", "Can't Help Falling In Love", "Taking Chances" and "The Christmas Song".

In addition, two instrumentals: "A New Love" and "Aria Di Lucia De Lammermoor" have been omitted as well.

Nevertheless, most of the "special" songs have been part of different TV specials.

There is no video performance of "Nature Boy" and "At Last". 
There is no video nor audio performance of "God Bless America" and "Happy Xmas (War Is Over)".

Promotion
"The Power of Love," "I Drove All Night," "I Surrender," and "I Wish" from the DVD were first released on the deluxe edition of Dion's album Taking Chances from November 2007. An exclusive sneak preview from the show was also included.

A New Day... was shown on television in selected countries, including the Netherlands (first part on 18 November and second one on 25 November 2007 on SBS 6), Spain (29 November 2007 on TVE2), South Africa (first part on 2 December and second one on 8 December 2007 on SABC 3), Italy (25 December 2007 on Italia 1), and Quebec (bonus features on 20 January 2008 and the show on 27 January 2008 on TVA).

A New Day... was also broadcast to movie theatres in some countries, including Poland (Multikino on 5 December 2007) and the United States (various theatres on 17 December 2007).

The Quebec TV station TVA broadcast a TV special dedicated to the last show of Dion at the Colosseum at Caesars Palace in Las Vegas, on 16 December 2007. The show was entitled Les Adieux de Céline Dion à Las Vegas (Céline Dion's Vegas Farewells). The cameras entered the intimacy of Dion and René Angélil during latest show's night (15 December). Viewers could see Céline Dion leaving her home with her husband and their son who attended his mother's show, Dion in her dressing room or in the elevator that took her to the stage.

Commercial performance
According to the Quebec press, Live in Las Vegas - A New Day... was completely sold-out in the province less than a few hours after its release. In addition, Dion made history on 18 January 2008 when Live in Las Vegas - A New Day... became the only music DVD to be certified triple Diamond in Canada, selling over 300,000 units. Only five other DVDs have ever reached double Diamond status in Canada. Dion's DVD also garnered the largest debut in Nielsen SoundScan history for a DVD-only release, with over 70,000 copies sold in its first week, which is something that has never occurred before in Canadian music history. Live in Las Vegas - A New Day... held the number 1 position on the Music DVD Chart in Canada for many weeks after its release.

Outside Canada, the DVD was also very successful and peaked at number 1 in the United States, United Kingdom, France, Japan, Switzerland, Netherlands, Belgium, Denmark, New Zealand and Estonia. It reached number 2 in Portugal and Sweden, number 3 in Argentina, Australia, Ireland and Greece, number 4 in Austria, number 6 in Italy and number 7 in Czech Republic. Live in Las Vegas - A New Day... also debuted in the top 10 in Finland and Germany.

Nearly 500,000 copies of the DVD were sold worldwide in its first week of release. Live in Las Vegas - A New Day... was certified 3× Diamond in Canada, Diamond in France, 4× Platinum in Australia, Platinum in the United Kingdom, Brazil, Portugal, Argentina and New Zealand, and Gold in the Netherlands and Belgium. In Japan, it has sold 30,000 copies during the first three months of its release.

In the United States, the Recording Industry Association of America (RIAA) certified this double-DVD 7× Platinum. However, it has sold 463,186 copies in the US as of 2 September 2012 and is eligible for 9× Platinum certification. According to Billboard, the DVD was the third best-selling music DVD of 2008 in the US and the best-selling by a female artist. It was also the tenth best-selling DVD in the US in 2009.

Accolades
In 2009, the DVD received a Juno Award nomination in category Music DVD of the Year.

Track listing

Charts

Weekly charts

Year-end charts

Certifications

Release history

References

2007 video albums
Albums recorded at Caesars Palace
Celine Dion video albums
Live video albums